The 1902–03 Catalan Football Championship was the 3rd staging of the Championship of Catalonia. This season was peculiar because it comprised two different competitions held the same year.

Due to disagreements between the reigning champion of the tournament, FC Barcelona, and some of the clubs invited, in 1902–03 two parallel competitions were held: an "official", the Copa Macaya organized by Hispania AC and an "unofficial", the Copa Barcelona organized by FC Barcelona. Both are currently recognized as official by the RFEF.

Copa Macaya

Summary 
The third and last edition of the Macaya Cup was to be contested by 5 teams: Club Espanyol, Hispania AC, FC Barcelona, Club Universitari and FC Internacional. The early resignations of Barcelona and Universitari were a severe blow to the competition, which turned it into a simple triangular tournament. In the end, Espanyol was the champion after beating Hispania 3–1 in a tiebreaker, with Gustavo Green netting twice. Remarkably, Green won all three editions of the Copa Macaya with three different clubs (Hispania, Barça, and Español).

Table

Results

Play-off 
This championship was extremely competitive, in fact, Club Espanyol and Hispania AC finished level on points at 6, which meant that the title had to be decided in a playoff match that was held a few months later.

Statistics

Top Scorers

Copa Barcelona

Summary 
After their 2–0 win over Hispania AC in the Copa Macaya was declared invalid for fielding an ineligible player, thus losing two points, FC Barcelona withdrew from the tournament as the club considered the decision totally unfounded and unfair. The club then broke its relations with the Gymnastics Federation and decides to organize a tournament of their own: The Copa Barcelona. Barça was able to pull this off because the club was clearly the most powerful and best organized club in Catalonia and one of the best in Spain, just like Madrid FC had done in the capital with the 1902 Copa de la Coronación. All the clubs of the city of Barcelona were invited, including the ones who were contesting the Copa Macaya, and the response from the clubs was much greater than expected, registering up to eleven teams, all of them from Barcelona, although three had to withdraw (X Sporting Club, Universitary SC and FC Catalònia) before the end of the tournament. The other five participating teams were Català FC, FC Internacional, Irish FC, Iberia FC and Salut FC. The Copa Barcelona is also considered an official tournament nowadays, being later recognized as the fourth edition of the Catalan Championship. So two rival competitions were organized (similar to the 1910 and 1913 editions of the Copa del Rey), and while Club Español won the third and last edition of the Copa Macaya after beating Hispania AC by 3–1 in the title-deciding play-off, Barcelona won the Copa Barcelona after a tough fight with Club Español, with whom he drew 2–2 both home and away, hedging out in the end by just two points.

The tournament's board offers prizes to all participants thanks to the financial collaboration of the members of FC Barcelona, with contributions of at least two pesetas and forty cents each. All participants had a prize: A Cup valued at 250 pesetas for the winner; medals for the first three; a lineman's flag for the fourth; a regulation ball for fifth; goalkeeper gloves for the sixth; a bellows for the seventh and a whistle for the last. The prizes may seem ridiculous, in view of today, but at that time it was quite a gesture of greatness for the tournament's board, since these objects were not easy to obtain and were highly valued. Joan Gamper was the star of the tournament and its top goal scorer with 21 goals, netting a 9-goal haul against X Sporting Club on 1 February 1903 and scoring the winner (0–1) against Hispania AC on 19 April 1903.

Table 

Notes
 Day 6: Iberia conceded the points due to the death of Ramon Irla i Serra, father of the president and captain of the club.
 Day 8: Salut and Internacional gave up the points.
 Day 11: all three games were suspended due to rain. Irish, Iberia and Salut conceded the points.
 Day 15: Iberia conceded the points due to the death of the mother of the player Castillo.
 Day 16: Salut gave up the points for Espanyol to be playing in the 1902 Copa de la Coronación in Madrid.
 Day 17: Hispania played with the second team to allow the first to contest the final of the Copa Macaya against Club Espanyol.

Results 
The list below only includes the matches played by Barcelona due to a lack of information about the remaining games.

Statistics

Top Scorers

See also 
 Copa Macaya
 Catalan football championship
 1902–03 FC Barcelona season

References

External links 
Federació Catalana de Futbol 

Copa Catalunya seasons
1902–03 in Spanish football
Defunct international club association football competitions in Europe